The Turnback the Alarm Handicap  is a Grade III American Thoroughbred horse race for fillies and mares, age three-years-old and older run over a distance  miles run annually in late October or early November usually Aqueduct Racetrack in Queens, New York. The event currently offers a purse of $150,000.

History

The event is named after, Turnback the Alarm, a winner of five Grade 1 races on New York Racing Association tracks in 1992 and 1993 including the Coaching Club American Oaks, Mother Goose Stakes as a three-year-old  and the Go for Wand Stakes, Shuvee Handicap,  Hempstead Handicap as a four-year-old. She was bought by Japanese interests and taken there in 1997, where she produced a winner from the sire Sunday Silence.

The event was inaugurated on 1 November 1995 and was won by Incinerate, who was ridden by Filiberto Leon and trained by the US Hall of Fame trainer H. Allen Jerkens in a time of 1:48.89 by three lengths.

In 1999 the event was classified as Grade III.

The event was held at Belmont Park in 2008, 2010 and between 2012–2017 and 2021. While the event was held at Belmont Park the distance was decreased to  miles.

Records
Speed record:
 miles: 1:48.89 - Incinerate (1995) 
 miles: 1:41.96 - America (2015) 

Margins:
 lengths - Indian Vale (2005) 

Most wins:
 No horse has won this race more than once.

Most wins by a jockey:
 5 - John Velazquez (1998, 1999, 2005, 2008, 2017)

Most wins by a trainer:
 4 - Todd A. Pletcher (2005, 2009, 2014, 2017)

Most wins by an owner:
 2 - Stronach Stables (1995, 2007)
 2 - Helen C. Alexander, Helen K. Groves & Dorothy A. Matz (2000, 2008)
 2 - Bobby Flay (2014, 2015)
 2 - Alpha Delta Stables (2012, 2016)

Winners

Notes:

§ Ran as an entry

See also
List of American and Canadian Graded races

References

Graded stakes races in the United States
Grade 3 stakes races in the United States
Horse races in the United States
Mile category horse races for fillies and mares
Recurring sporting events established in 1995
1995 establishments in New York City
Aqueduct Racetrack